The Hellman Building is a historic building in Downtown Los Angeles.

Location
The Hellman Building is located on the corner of Fourth and Spring streets, in the Old Bank District.

History

Herman W. Hellman, a German-born American Jewish businessman and banker, had built buildings also known as "Hellman Building" (also "H. W. Hellman Building", "New Hellman Building"):
one mentioned in 1876 on Third Street between Main Street and Spring streets, where a musical boarding school was located
one built in 1882 on Main and Commercial streets "next to Litchenberger's", between Court and First streets
one at Third and Main streets in 1892
another at the northeast corner of Second Street and Broadway in 1897

The Fourth and Spring Hellman building was erected in 1903. It was designed by architect Alfred Rosenheim.

It took the place of a house originally built by Hellman, a small wooden cottage, designed by Kysor & Mathews in 1875.

References

Office buildings in Los Angeles
Buildings and structures in Downtown Los Angeles
Bank buildings in California
Office buildings completed in 1903
1903 establishments in California
1900s architecture in the United States
Neoclassical architecture in California
Hellman family